Karisimbi may refer to:
 Mount Karisimbi, an inactive volcano in the Virunga Mountains
 Karisimbi (commune), an administrative division of Goma, Democratic Republic of the Congo